Mark Janney (born 2 December 1977) is an English former football midfielder. He began his career in the youth system at Premier League club Tottenham Hotspur and is best remembered for his eight-year spell with Dagenham & Redbridge. He made two Football League appearances during a loan spell at Brentford. He won a cap for England C at international level.

Playing career

Tottenham Hotspur 
Growing up in Romford, Janney was signed by Premier League club Tottenham Hotspur as a schoolboy and worked his way through the club's youth system to the reserve team. Though he signed a professional contract in 1996, he failed to make an appearance for the first team and joined Second Division club Brentford in March 1997. His first involvement with the first team came when he was named as a substitute for a match away to Gillingham on 31 March. With the Bees 1–0 down, captain Jamie Bates suffered an injury after 36 minutes and Janney replaced him to make the first professional appearance of his career. He scored an equaliser with his first touch of the ball in League football and Brentford won the match through a 50th-minute winner from Carl Asaba. Janney started the following game against Shrewsbury Town, but was replaced after 49 minutes by Brian Statham during a 0–0 draw. It proved to be his final appearance for the club.

Janney departed White Hart Lane at the end of the 1996–97 season. In 2001, he remarked that he was devastated after his release from Tottenham Hotspur, saying "when you've got your heart set on something and you're told you're not good enough then obviously it hits you. If I'm honest, I knew I was never going to make it at Tottenham. I was in the youth team with Stephen Carr, Luke Young and Stephen Clemence, but it was very hard to get a game with all the pros there".

Dagenham & Redbridge 
After unsuccessful trials at Football League clubs Colchester United and Southend United, Janney signed for Isthmian League Premier Division club Dagenham & Redbridge in September 1997. A hamstring injury wiped out most of his 1998–99 season. Janney won the first silverware of his career during the 1999–00 season, when the Daggers were promoted to the Conference as Isthmian League Premier Division champions. He made 39 appearances and scored three goals during the 2000–01 season, as the Daggers finished third in their first season in the Conference. Janney was a virtual ever-present during the 2001–02 season, making 41 appearances and scoring two goals.

A fifth-place finish saw the Dagenham qualify for the Conference playoffs in the 2002–03 season, but the club's season ended with a 3–2 extra time golden goal defeat to Doncaster Rovers in the final. Janney made 35 appearances during the 2002–03 season and scored four goals. Dagenham stumbled to a mid-table finish during the 2003–04 season and Janney still made 42 appearances and scored two goals. The 2004–05 season proved to be the last of Janney's Dagenham career, in which he made 28 appearances and scored three goals. He departed the club at the end of the season, having failed to agree a new contract. Janney made nearly 300 appearances during his eight-year Daggers career.

Maldon Town 
Janney had a brief spell at Isthmian League Premier Division club Maldon Town during the 2005 off-season and made no competitive appearances.

Heybridge Swifts 
Janney signed for Isthmian League Premier Division club Heybridge Swifts in August 2005. He eight league appearances for the club without scoring before departing in October 2005.

Thurrock 
Janney joined Conference South club Thurrock in October 2005. He departed the club in July 2006, having made 25 league appearances and scored two goals.

AFC Hornchurch 
Janney signed for Isthmian League First Division North club A.F.C. Hornchurch in July 2006, linking up with former Thurrock manager Colin McBride. He won the second and third pieces of silverware of his career during his debut season, as Hornchurch won the 2006–07 Isthmian League First Division North title and the Essex Senior Cup. He also won the 2006–07 FA Cup Golden Boot Award, for scoring eight goals during Hornchurch's run to the third qualifying round. He made 40 appearances and scored 10 goals during the 2006–07 season. In his first season back in the Isthmian League Premier Division, Janney made 36 appearances and scored six goals. He had a consistent 2008–09 season, making 37 league appearances and scoring 9 goals. A ruptured hamstring suffered in February 2010 ended Janney's career. He had made 29 appearances and scored two goals during the 2009–10 season, before suffering the injury. Janney was awarded a testimonial by Hornchurch in September 2012, in which a Hornchurch Legends XI took on a Daggers Legends XI to celebrate Janney's career and long associations with A.F.C. Hornchurch and Dagenham & Redbridge.

International career 
Janney won an England C cap in a match against Netherlands Amateurs in March 2001.

Personal life 
Janney is a West Ham United supporter.

Career statistics

Honours 
 Dagenham & Redbridge
Isthmian League Premier Division: 1999–00
 A.F.C. Hornchurch
 Isthmian League First Division North: 2006–07
 Essex Senior Cup: 2006–07

Individual

 FA Cup Golden Boot Award: 2006–07

References

External links

1977 births
Living people
English footballers
Association football midfielders
Brentford F.C. players
Braintree Town F.C. players
Maldon & Tiptree F.C. players
Heybridge Swifts F.C. players
Thurrock F.C. players
Hornchurch F.C. players
Dagenham & Redbridge F.C. players
Tottenham Hotspur F.C. players
England semi-pro international footballers
National League (English football) players
English Football League players
Isthmian League players